This is a list of official residences of university and college presidents.

Canada

University of Toronto President's Estate

United States

References

Official residences